Morenga may refer to:
 Jacob Morenga (c. 1875–1907), Namibian chief leader in the insurrection against Germany
 , German novel by Uwe Timm from 1978
 Morenga (film), German drama film by Egon Günther from 1985

See also 
 Moringa (disambiguation)